The Island Pacific Hotel is a 4-star hotel in Sai Ying Pun, Hong Kong.

By May 2021 the Office for Safeguarding National Security began using the hotel.

References

External links
 
 Island Pacific Hotel at Sino Hotels

1999 establishments in Hong Kong
Hotel buildings completed in 1999
Hotels established in 1999
Hotels in Hong Kong
Sai Ying Pun
Sino Group